Maendeleo is an administrative ward in the Mbeya Urban district of the Mbeya Region of Tanzania. In 2016 the Tanzania National Bureau of Statistics report there were 3,161 people in the ward, from 5,223 in 2012.

Neighborhoods 
The ward has 5 neighborhoods.
 Centre Community
 Kati
 Kiwanja Mpaka
 Kiwanja Ngoma
 Soko Matola

References 

Wards of Mbeya Region